Heretics is a collection of 20 essays by G. K. Chesterton and published by John Lane in 1905. While the loci of the chapters of Heretics are personalities, the topics he debates are as universal to the "vague moderns" of the 21st century  as they were to those of the 20th. He quotes at length and argues extensively against atheist Joseph McCabe, delivers diatribes about his close personal friend and intellectual rival, George Bernard Shaw, as well as Friedrich Nietzsche, H. G. Wells, Rudyard Kipling and an array of other major intellectuals of his day, many of whom he knew personally. The topics he touches upon range from cosmology to anthropology to soteriology and he argues against French nihilism, German humanism, English utilitarianism, the syncretism of "the vague modern", Social Darwinism, eugenics and the arrogance and misanthropy of the European intelligentsia. Together with Orthodoxy, this book is regarded as central to his corpus of moral theology.

Chapters

Introductory Remarks on the Importance of Orthodoxy
On the Negative Spirit
On Mr. Rudyard Kipling and Making the World Small
Mr. Bernard Shaw
Mr. H. G. Wells and the Giants
Christmas and the Esthetes
Omar and the Sacred Vine
The Mildness of the Yellow Press
The Moods of Mr. George Moore
On Sandals and Simplicity
Science and the Savages
Paganism and Mr. Lowes Dickinson
Celts and Celtophiles
On Certain Modern Writers and the Institution of the Family
On Smart Novelists and the Smart Set
On Mr. McCabe and a Divine Frivolity
On the Wit of Whistler
The Fallacy of the Young Nation
Slum Novelists and the Slums
Concluding Remarks on the Importance of Orthodoxy

See also

G. K. Chesterton 
Orthodoxy (book)
Christian apologetics

References

External links

 
 
 

1905 non-fiction books
Books by G. K. Chesterton
Books of literary criticism
English essay collections